"Patricosaurus" (meaning "paternal lizard") is the name given to a dubious and chimeric genus of reptile from the Early Cretaceous. It is based on a femur and sacrum from two animals: the femur from a large lepidosaur, and the sacrum from an archosaur (Barrett and Evans, 2002), both specimens are known from the Cambridge Greensand. The type species, Patricosaurus merocratus, was described by Harry Seeley in 1887, and was originally thought to have been a lizard. The femur was estimated to be 8-10 cm long when complete, belonging to an animal with a vent-snout length of 0.8-0.9 metres and a maximum body length of two metres.

References
Barrett, P.M., and Evans, S.E. 2002. A reassessment of the Early Cretaceous reptile Patricosaurus merocratus Seeley from the Cambridge Greensand, Cambridgeshire, UK. Cretaceous Research 23: 231–240.  
Seeley, H.G. 1887. On Patricosaurus merocratus, Seeley, a lizard from the Cambridge Greensand, preserved in the Woodwardian Museum of the University of Cambridge. Quarterly Journal of the Geological Society of London 43:216-220.

External links
  and
  Dinosaur Mailing List entries on Patricosaurus

Early Cretaceous reptiles of Europe
Nomina dubia
Fossils of Great Britain